C. Durairaj (died 5 January 2014) was an Indian politician and presently serving Member of the Legislative Assembly of Tamil Nadu. He was elected to the Tamil Nadu legislative assembly as an Anna Dravida Munnetra Kazhagam candidate from Sedapatti constituency in 2001 and 2006 elections.

He served as the Minister for Local Administration of TamilNadu from (May2001-Aug2002)

References 

All India Anna Dravida Munnetra Kazhagam politicians
2014 deaths